Jason Davis may refer to:

Jason Davis (actor, born 1984), American actor featured in Rush Hour and Recess
Jason Davis (American actor), American actor known from Prison Break
Jason Davis (American football) (born 1983), American football fullback
Jason Davis (baseball) (born 1980), former Major League Baseball pitcher
Jason Davis (boxer) (born 1982), American boxer, see Joan Guzmán
Jason Davis (footballer) (born 1984), Bermudian international soccer player
Jason Davis, aka Jabba (presenter) (born 1973), Australian radio and television personality

See also
Jay Davis, actor
Jason Davies, Welsh bowls player
Jason Vaughan-Davies, Zimbabwean cricketer